

Dudley East  is a locality in the Australian state of  South Australia located on the Dudley Peninsula on Kangaroo Island about  south of the state capital of Adelaide.

Its boundaries were created in March 2002 for the “long established name.”  The locality is reported as being so named because it is located in the eastern part of the cadastral unit of the Hundred of Dudley.

The principal land use within the locality is agriculture.  The locality includes the Rock Villa, Hog Bay River Station which is listed on the South Australian Heritage Register.

Dudley East is located within the federal division of Mayo, the state electoral district of Mawson and the local government area of the Kangaroo Island Council.

See also
Dudley (disambiguation)

References
Notes

Citations

Towns on Kangaroo Island
Dudley Peninsula